The Cape Town Open Education Declaration is a major international statement on open access, open education and open educational resources. It emerged from a conference on open education hosted in Cape Town on 14 and 15 September 2007 by the Shuttleworth Foundation and the Open Society Institute. The aim of this meeting [being] to "accelerate efforts to promote open resources, technology, and teaching practices in education". Individuals and organizations that sign the Declaration share its "statement of principle, a statement of strategy and a statement of commitment".

The declaration was released officially  on January 22, 2008. 

As of January 2014, over 2,400 individuals and 250 organisations (including the Wikimedia Foundation) have signed the declaration.

See also 
Budapest Open Access Initiative
UNESCO 2012 Paris OER Declaration

References

External links

 Text of the Declaration
 Audio version of the Declaration

Open access statements
Open content
2007 documents